City Montessori School, RDSO Branch (or CMS RDSO) is a private school in Lucknow, India. It offers education up to the level of Class XII.  It is a co-educational, English Medium institution affiliated to Indian Certificate of Secondary Education Board, New Delhi. The school has been ranked 6th in the "most respected secondary schools" in India list compiled by IMRB in 2007

History  
CMS RDSO was established in 1964 under the guidance of Preeti Kaur. The school progressed under the leadership of the Principals, Mrs. Sindhi, Dr. Kamran, Mrs. S. Mansharamani and Mrs. Aruna Naidu

Leadership 
The present Principal is Jyotsna Atul. The Senior Section Incharge is Richa Gaur, who also heads the senior wing of the branch. The Junior in charge is Monika Malik. Mrs. Samhita Tiwari is the Primary in charge.

Organization 
CMS RDSO comprises four sections:

 Pre-Primary Section
 CMS has adopted the Montessori method of preschool education. The Pre-Primary section admits boys and girls between the ages of 2 and 5 as follows:
 Montessori: 2 to 3 years of age (Play Group)
 Nursery: 4 years of age 
 Kindergarten: 5 years of age
 Primary Section
 The Primary Section consists of Grades I-V.
 The Primary Section In charge is Samhita Tiwari.
 Junior Section
 The Junior Section consists of Grades VI-VIII.
 Monika Malik is in charge of Junior section.
 Senior Section
The Senior Section consists of Grades IX-XII.
The Senior Section in charge is  Richa Gaur.

Location
The school is located in RDSO Colony.

Standardized test performance
In 2012 CMS RDSO produced the Lucknow city ICSE top student Gaurav Chandela who secured 98.6% in 2012 ICSE boards. The top ten position holders of CMS RDSO branch scored 95% and above in the ICSE boards in 2011-2012. Anika Pandey led the ISC Board in 2010-11 with 96.5% marks in the Commerce stream. Ms. Anika and Manjari Yadav, secured the required cutoff  for the Shri Ram College of Commerce, New Delhi. Shagun Srivastava topped the ICSE Boards with 95.80% marks. Five students cleared the first stage of NTSE 2011. Shivansh Gaur qualified the IIT JEE 2011. Gaur also secured 92% marks in ISC Boards 2011.

Extracurricular activities
CMS RDSO students participate in national and international competitions including International Robotics Olympiads, International Quality Circle Conventions, International Astronomy Olympiads, Environmental workshops, International Science festivals like Quanta, Macfair, Cofas, Celesta, SAARC Youth Festival, World Peace Festival, Children’s International Summer Village (CISV) Camps, International School to School Exchange programmes, National Mathematics Olympiads, WIZMIC National Talent Search Examination and National Choral Singing Competitions and Sports Olympiads like EXSPO International.

References

External links 
 
 
 
 
 
  

Montessori schools in India
Primary schools in Uttar Pradesh
High schools and secondary schools in Uttar Pradesh
Private schools in Lucknow
Educational institutions established in 1964
1964 establishments in Uttar Pradesh